In the First World War, Bruno Loerzer became a fighter ace credited with 44 confirmed aerial victories while flying for the German Luftstreitkräfte.

List of victories

References

|Aerial victories of Loerzer, Bruno
Loerzer, Bruno